Garbiñe Abasolo García (born May 17, 1964) was the first Miss Spain from the Basque region. She was crowned in 1983. She later went on to represent Spain in both Miss Universe 1984 and Miss Europe 1984 where she didn't win but was chosen as Miss Photogenic in both pageants. She has been the only contestant from Spain to be chosen for both pageants. She is married and mother of two children.

References

1964 births
Basque women
Living people
Miss Europe
Miss Universe 1984 contestants
Miss Spain winners
People from Bilbao
Spanish television presenters
Spanish women television presenters